The Avance is a river in the Hautes Alpes department, France. It is a right tributary of the Durance.

References 

Rivers of France
Rivers of Provence-Alpes-Côte d'Azur
Rivers of Hautes-Alpes